Anne Veronica Tennant, Baroness Glenconner  (née Coke; born 16 July 1932) is a British peeress and socialite. The daughter of the 5th Earl of Leicester, Lady Glenconner served as a maid of honour at the coronation of Elizabeth II in 1953, and was extra lady-in-waiting to Queen Elizabeth II's sister, Princess Margaret, Countess of Snowdon, from 1971 until the Princess died in 2002. Her 2019 memoir, Lady in Waiting: My Extraordinary Life in the Shadow of the Crown, was a New York Times Best Seller.

Early life
Lady Glenconner was born Anne Veronica Coke (pronounced "Cook") in London on 16 July 1932. Her parents were The Hon. Thomas Coke and his wife Lady Elizabeth (née Yorke), the son and daughter of the then-Thomas Coke, Viscount Coke and Charles Yorke, 8th Earl of Hardwicke, respectively. Lady Glenconner's great-grandfather, Thomas Coke, 3rd Earl of Leicester, died in 1941, making her grandfather the 4th Earl of Leicester and her father Viscount Coke. A few years later in 1949, her grandfather died, and her father became 5th Earl of Leicester. Lady Glenconner had two younger sisters, Carey (1934–2018) and Sarah (born 1944). Their father was equerry to George VI from 1932 to 1952.

Lady Glenconner was primarily raised at her family's estate, Holkham Hall in Norfolk. During the Second World War, she and her sister Carey stayed at Cortachy Castle with their paternal great-aunt Alexandra, Countess of Airlie, their aunt's husband David Ogilvy, 12th Earl of Airlie, and the Airlies' children (including David and Angus).

As the King and Queen Elizabeth's Sandringham House was less than 20 miles from Holkham, Lady Glenconner was a regular playmate of the young Princess Elizabeth and Princess Margaret. The King and Queen were friends with Lady Glenconner's parents, and the family was often invited to Christmas parties at Buckingham Palace with the royal family.

In 1950, at the age of 18, she was formally presented at court, and was named 'debutante of the year' by Tatler magazine. In 1953, Lady Glenconner was selected to be one of the maids of honour at the coronation of Elizabeth II in Westminster Abbey. She was engaged to Johnnie Althorp, later father to Diana, Princess of Wales; his father objected to the match on the grounds of "mad blood", a reference to her Trefusis ancestry which was shared by institutionalised relatives of the queen, and the engagement was broken off. (In 1997, the director of the Murdoch Children's Research Institute opined that a genetic disease in the Hepburn-Stuart-Forbes-Trefusis family (i.e. of Anne's paternal grandmother) may have killed male members of the family in early childhood and caused learning disabilities in females.)

Marriage and children
On 21 April 1956 at St Withburga's Church, Holkham, Lady Glenconner married the Hon. Colin Christopher Paget Tennant, son of the 2nd Baron Glenconner. The guests included Queen Elizabeth The Queen Mother and Princess Margaret; the Princess's future husband, Antony Armstrong-Jones, was the wedding photographer.

Lord and Lady Glenconner had five children, three sons and twin daughters:
The Hon. Charles Edward Pevensey Tennant (15 February 1957 – 19 October 1996). He was a heroin addict for many years, but recovered with the help of Sheilagh Scott whom he later married in 1993. His son, Cody Charles Edward Tennant (born 2 February 1994), became the 4th Baron Glenconner in 2010. Charles died of Hepatitis C in October 1996. 
The Hon. Henry Lovell Tennant (21 February 1960 – 2 January 1990). He married Teresa Cormack in 1983. He died from AIDS. His son, Euan Lovell Tennant (born 1983) is the current heir presumptive to the barony. Euan is married to Helen Tennant. They have two children. 
The Hon. Christopher Cary Tennant (born 25 April 1968). He suffered severe brain damage in a motorcycle accident in 1987. He married Anastasia Papadakos in 1996, with whom he has two children. The couple later divorced. He married secondly Johanna Lissack Hurn on 11 February 2011.
The Hon. Flora May Pamela Tennant (8 November 1970), a god-daughter of Princess Margaret. She married on 18 April 2005 to Anton Ronald Noah Creasy. They have two children.
The Hon. Amy Jasmine Elizabeth Tennant (8 November 1970). No issue.

Lady Glenconner's husband acceded to the title of Baron Glenconner on his father's death on 4 October 1983, having already inherited the family's estate in the Scottish Borders, The Glen. Lord and Lady Glenconner divided their time between Mustique, St Lucia, and the United Kingdom.

Lord and Lady Glenconner were married for 54 years until Lord Glenconner's death in 2010. She now resides in King's Lynn, Norfolk. When Lord Glenconner died in 2010, it was revealed that he had made a new will shortly before his death leaving all of his assets to an employee, Kent Adonai. The family contested this will, and after a legal battle that lasted several years the estate was divided between Adonai and Cody Charles Edward Tennant, the fourth Lord Glenconner.

Activism 
In the 1970s, Lady Glenconner was a fundraiser for Refuge on the invitation of its founder, Erin Pizzey.

Friendship with Princess Margaret
When Princess Margaret married Antony Armstrong-Jones in 1960, Lady Glenconner and her husband offered them a piece of land on their privately owned island, Mustique, which Lord Glenconner had bought in 1958 for £45,000. They also agreed to build a house for the couple on the land. It was designed in 1971 by the leading stage designer and uncle to Lord Snowdon, Oliver Messel, and subsequently named "Les Jolies Eaux" (French: "The pretty waters"). Messel also designed other properties on the island.

In 1971, Lady Glenconner entered into the Princess's service as her Extra Lady-in-Waiting. Lady Glenconner was a lady-in-waiting until Princess Margaret died in 2002 at the age of 71. Over the course of her service, she accompanied the Princess on many tours abroad to destinations including the United States, Australia and Hong Kong; once, she stood in for the Princess on a trip to the Philippines to meet with Imelda Marcos, after the Princess became ill with pneumonia. Princess Margaret would visit Lady Glenconner at her Norfolk home, where she would sometimes help by laying the fire or washing the car.

It was Lady Glenconner and her husband who introduced Princess Margaret to Roddy Llewellyn, who began a relationship to the then-still married Princess in 1973, when he was 25 and she 43. The much publicised eight-year relationship was a factor in the dissolution of the Princess's marriage to Lord Snowdon.

Speaking in the 2018 documentary Elizabeth: Our Queen, Lady Glenconner said the Queen discussed Llewellyn with her after Princess Margaret's funeral in 2002. She offered Lady Glenconner thanks for having introduced her sister to Roddy, because "he made her really happy".

For her personal service rendered to the Royal Family, Lady Glenconner was made a Lieutenant of the Royal Victorian Order in the 1991 Birthday Honours.

In 2019, Lady Glenconner's memoir Lady in Waiting: My Extraordinary Life in the Shadow of the Crown, was published by Hodder & Stoughton. Speaking on her reason for publishing the book, she said: "I was so fed up with people writing such horrible things about Princess Margaret." In particular, she described Craig Brown's Ma'am Darling as "that horrible book, we won't mention the name of the somebody who wrote it. I don't know why people want to rot her like that."

Awards and honours

United Kingdom

In popular culture
 Lady Glenconner is portrayed by Grace Stone in the second, and Nancy Carroll in the third and fourth seasons of the Netflix television series The Crown.

Bibliography
 Lady in Waiting: My Extraordinary Life in the Shadow of the Crown. London: Hodder & Stoughton 2019. 
 Murder on Mustique. London: Hodder & Stoughton 2020. 
 A Haunting at Holkham. London: Hodder & Stoughton 2020. 
 Whatever Next?: Lessons from an Unexpected Life. London: Hodder & Stoughton 2022.

References

1932 births
Living people
British ladies-in-waiting
People from Holkham
Anne
British debutantes
Glenconner
Lieutenants of the Royal Victorian Order
British maids of honour
Daughters of British earls